Selviytyjät Suomi (season 5) is the fifth season of the Finnish reality show Selviytyjät Suomi based on the Swedish reality series Expedition Robinson. Due to the COVID-19 pandemic, the season was filmed in the forests of Haparanda, Sweden where 16 celebrities competed to win €30,000. The season premiered on 27 February 2021 and concluded 5 June 2021 when Big Brother winner Kristian Heiskari won against Former Police Officer & Coach, Marianne Kiukkonen in a 6-3 jury vote.

Finishing order

Notes

References

Externtal links

2021 Finnish television seasons
Survivor Finland seasons